Inez E. Dickens (born July 15, 1949) is the Assemblymember for the 70th district of the New York State Assembly. She is a Democrat. The district includes portions of El Barrio, Hamilton Heights, Harlem, and Morningside Heights in Manhattan. She formerly served on the New York City Council from 2006 to 2016, representing the 9th district.

Life and career
Dickens is a lifelong resident of New York City. Her father, Lloyd E. Dickens, was a Democratic District Leader and a member of the New York Assembly, and her uncle Thomas K. Dickens was an assemblyman and a justice on the New York Supreme Court. She attended P.S. 133 and Julia Richman High School, and later did undergraduate studies in real estate and land economics at New York University and later at Howard University but did not graduate. Dickens was first elected to office in 1974 as a State Party Committeewoman, and served in that capacity for 32 years.

In the 2004 presidential election, she served as one of New York's 33 presidential electors, casting her ballot for John Kerry. After Bill Perkins opted to run for Manhattan Borough President in 2005, Dickens entered the primary for City Council to replace him, and won. She won re-election handily in 2009 and again in 2013.

Inez became the councilmember for the 9th New York City Council District in 2006, serving the communities of Central Harlem, Morningside Heights, East Harlem and parts of the Upper West Side. As a newly elected council member, Inez was appointed majority whip and chair of the Committee on Standards and Ethics. She became the first African-American woman in the history of the New York City Council to be appointed to the positions of deputy majority leader and chair of the Subcommittee on Planning, Dispositions and Concessions.

In August 2013, the New York Post wrote a series of articles detailing Inez Dicken's history as a landlord.  As of July 2013, she had $265,000 in unpaid code violations dating as far back as 2004, earning her a spot on the Public Advocate's "Worst Landlord's Watch List."  She had previously voted to improve "slumlord accountability."

New York Assembly
In 2016, Assemblyman Keith L. T. Wright, who had served in the Assembly for over 25 years, announced he would run to succeed long-time Congressman Charlie Rangel.  However, his campaign was unsuccessful, losing to state Senator Adriano Espaillat in a very close race.  While Wright had the opportunity to again run for his Assembly seat, he had promised not to, and instead retired to the private sector.

As a result, Dickens, term-limited at the end of 2017 in the Council, was selected to run for the seat. She was unopposed in the primary, and won the general election against Republican Heather Tarrant by a 93% to 7% margin. Dickens was sworn into her first term in the Assembly on January 1, 2017. State Senator Bill Perkins, who held Dickens' council seat until 2005, was elected to replace her in 2017.

A new purportedly grassroots non-profit organization, "New York 4 Harlem", that actively solicited donations of $500 to $5,000 was reported in 2018 to allegedly have been a front for Dickens and three other Harlem elected officials. 
In addition, a flyer organizing a free bus trip to Albany for a conference organized by the NY State Assn. of Black and Puerto Rican Legislators with the New York 4 Harlem's name on it featured a picture of Dickens and the three other officials. Nonprofit organizations (501c3 organizations) except 501c4 organizations are not allowed to take part in campaign activity. The contact person for the event was a staffer working in the office of one of the other three legislators.

Dickens is one of the wealthiest members of the Assembly, with an estimated net worth of $2.1 million.

Election history

Further reading
Paterson, David "Black, Blind, & In Charge: A Story of Visionary Leadership and Overcoming Adversity." New York, New York, 2020

References

External links 
 Assemblymember Inez Dickens official website

Living people
New York City Council members
2004 United States presidential electors
Women state legislators in New York (state)
New York (state) Democrats
2000 United States presidential electors
2008 United States presidential electors
Women New York City Council members
21st-century American politicians
21st-century American women politicians
David Paterson
Julia Richman Education Complex alumni
African-American state legislators in New York (state)
1949 births